Samuel Meeker (1763–1831) was a prominent merchant businessman who played a substantial role in the development of banking, shipping, and insurance systems in the early post-revolutionary days of Philadelphia, Pennsylvania.

The Meeker family was already known by this time as a founding family in New Jersey (associate founder William Meeker), providing strong and hardy patriotic males in the fight against the British.  A Meeker cousin, Major Samuel Meeker, was known to have encouraged his militia to chase after Chief Joseph Brant and his band of warriors and Tories in the Battle of the Minisink.  Samuel’s father, also a ‘Samuel Meeker’, was a captain and commanded a troop of light horse that was recruited in Essex county NJ. A young man of action, Samuel left New Jersey early in the 1790s to seek his fame and fortune in Philadelphia.

References
History of Elizabeth, NJ – Edwin Hatfield, Carlton & Lanahan 1868
The Passaic Valley, New Jersey, in Three Centuries –  John Whitehead, The New Jersey Genealogical Society 1901
As We Were: the Story of Old Elizabethtown – Theodore Thayer  The Grassmann Publishing Co, Inc      Elizabeth, New Jersey  1964
The Meeker Family of Early New Jersey –  Leroy J. Meeker Capitol Printing Co. Charleston, W. VA 1973

1763 births
1831 deaths
Businesspeople from Philadelphia